is a single-member constituency of the Japanese House of Representatives, the lower house of the National Diet. It is located in Gunma Prefecture and consists of the cities of Maebashi and Numata and the district of Tone as well as parts of the cities of Kiryū, Shibukawa and Midori. As of 2012, 387,120 eligible voters were registered in the district.

Until 2009, Gunma had been a traditional "conservative kingdom" (hoshu-ōkoku), the Japanese equivalent of a "red state" in the United States. Like all single member districts in Gunma, the 1st district had been represented by the Liberal Democratic Party (LDP) since 1997. The LDP used the Costa Rica method (kosutarika-hōshiki) with Koji Omi and Genichiro Sata as alternating candidates for the district. In the election of 2009, Omi was the LDP's candidate; incumbent Sata only ran in the Northern Kantō proportional representation block. Both Omi and Sata had represented the pre-reform three-member 1st district of Gunma. The Democratic Party's candidate in 2009 was Takeshi Miyazaki, a former journalist for the Jōmō Shimbun. In 2012, Sata regained the district for the LDP.
In 2013, the weekly magazine Shukan Shincho accused Sata of inappropriate sexual conduct. In the 2014 elections, Sata lost considerable support and did not receive endorsement from Komeito, but still managed to hold onto his seat.

Between 2017 and 2021, the representative was Asako Omi, the daughter of previous representative Kōji Omi. In 2021, the district was won by Yasutaka Nakasone, son of former Foreign Minister Hirofumi Nakasone and grandson of Yasuhiro Nakasone who was Prime Minister 1982-1987.

Areas Covered

Current District 
As of 24 January 2023, the areas covered by this district are as follows:

 Maebashi
 Numata
 Tone District

As part of the 2022 redistricting, all cities in Gunma Prefecture were consolidated into single districts, with the exception of Takasaki. As a result of this, the district lost the parts it had gained of the cities of Kiryū, Shibukawa and Midori during the 2013 redistricting

Areas from 2013-2022 
From the first redistricting in 2013, and the second redistricting in 2022, the areas covered by this district were as follows:

 Maebashi
 Kiryū (Former villages of Niisato and Kurohone)
 Numata
 Shibukawa (Former villages of Akagi and Kitatachibana)
 Midori (Former village of Azuma)
 Tone District

As part of the 2013 redistricting, the district gained area in the cities of Kiryū, Shibukawa and Midori. Seta District was merged into the city of Maebashi in 2009, though the area is still covered under the boundaries of Maebashi.

Areas from before 2013 
From the creation of the district in 1994, until the first redistricting in 2013, the areas covered by this district were as follows:

 Maebashi
 Numata
 Seta District
 Tone District

Elected Representatives

Election Results

References 

Districts of the House of Representatives (Japan)
Gunma Prefecture